Magnolia xanthantha is a species of flowering plant in the family Magnoliaceae. It is endemic to China.

References

xanthantha
Endemic flora of China
Trees of China
Endangered flora of Asia
Taxonomy articles created by Polbot